The Hong Kong Ladies Masters was a golf tournament on the Ladies Asian Golf Tour hosted in Hong Kong.

History
The event was played at the par-73 Kau Sai Chau's North Course in 2005 and at the par-72 Discovery Bay in 2006. The prize money of the tournament was US$80,000 through co-sponsorship by Cathay Pacific' Asia Miles.

The inaugural event in 2006 was won by sixteen-year-old Pornanong Phatlum, who would not pick up the first-prize cheque due to her amateur status. The following year American Libby Smith recorded her first professional win by beating Shih Huei-ju of Taiwan at the first hole of a sudden death playoff, after they had tied on 212 following rounds of 66 and 68 respectively.

After a few years absence Hong Kong became a stop on the Ladies Asian Golf Tour again in 2015 with the Hong Kong Ladies Open.

Winners

See also
Hong Kong Ladies Open

References

Ladies Asian Golf Tour events
Golf tournaments in Hong Kong
Recurring sporting events established in 2006
2006 establishments in Hong Kong